A by-election was held in the Nui constituency in Tuvalu on 24 August 2011. It was triggered by the death of the incumbent, MP Isaia Italeli, the Minister for Works, who died quite suddenly in late July while in Samoa on government business. Although there are no political parties in Tuvalu, Members of Parliament align themselves with the government or with the Opposition, and Italeli's death had resulted in Prime Minister Willy Telavi's government losing its one-seat majority in Parliament. The by-election was thus highly important to the government's survival.

Nui is a two-seat constituency, and in the 2010 general election it had returned Isaia Italeli and Taom Tanukale with 24.6% and 23% of the vote respectively, ahead of three other candidates.

For the by-election, only one seat would be provided for, Tanukale retaining the other. There were only two candidates: Pelenike Isaia, Italeli's widow, who was the candidate supported by Telavi's government; and Leneuoti Maatusi, who had stood unsuccessfully during the general election. Pelenike Isaia was elected with a 62-vote majority, by 336 votes to 274. She declared that she hoped to accomplish what her husband had set out to do, and added that she would be supporting Telavi's government.

Her election made history, as she became only the second woman ever to sit in Tuvalu's Parliament, following Naama Maheu Latasi from 1989 to 1997.

Result

2010 result

References

2011 elections in Oceania
2011 in Tuvalu
By-elections to the Parliament of Tuvalu
Non-partisan elections